The Villain Foiled is a 1911 silent film short directed by Henry Lehrman and Mack Sennett and starring Edward Dillon and Blanche Sweet. The film was a split reel along with the film The Baron.

Cast 
Edward Dillon as Harry, the fiancé
Blanche Sweet as Miss Page
Joseph Graybill as Hector Durant, the villain
Kate Bruce as Miss Page's mother
William J. Butler as club valet
Dell Henderson as Harry's 2nd friend
Eddie Lyons as club member
Fred Mace as Harry's 1st friend
Vivian Prescott

External links 

1911 films
American silent short films
1911 comedy films
1911 short films
Silent American comedy films
American black-and-white films
American comedy short films
Films directed by Dell Henderson
Films directed by Mack Sennett
1910s American films